Aulacophora approximata is a species of leaf beetle in the genus Aulacophora that was discovered by Baly in 1886.

References

Beetles described in 1886
Aulacophora
Taxa named by Joseph Sugar Baly